The eighth season of the American competitive reality television series MasterChef Junior premiered on Fox on March 17, 2022, and concluded on June 23, 2022. Gordon Ramsay and Aarón Sanchez returned as judges from the previous season, while Daphne Oz joined as a new judge. The season was won by Liya Chu, a 10-year-old from Scarsdale, New York, with Grayson Price from Austin, Texas being the runner-up.

Production 
The season was filmed in 2019, prior to the COVID-19 pandemic, and was officially announced on July 17, 2019. Additionally, it was revealed that Gordon Ramsay and Aarón Sanchez would return as judges, along with new judge Daphne Oz replacing Christina Tosi.

The season was originally slated to premiere in September 2020 during the 2020–21 United States television season, but was later pushed to the 2021–22 television season, being replaced by I Can See Your Voice. On January 26, 2022, it was announced that the eighth season would premiere on March 17, 2022.

Top 16 
Sources for first names and hometowns:

Elimination table

  (WINNER) This cook won the competition.
  (RUNNER-UP) This cook finished in second place.
  (WIN) The cook won an individual challenge (Mystery Box Challenge, Elimination Test, Pressure Test, or Skills Challenge).
  (WIN) The cook was on the winning team in the Team Challenge and directly advanced to the next round.
  (HIGH) The cook was one of the top entries in the individual challenge but didn't win.
  (IN) The cook was not selected as a top or bottom entry in an individual challenge.
  (IN) The cook was not selected as a top or bottom entry in a Team Challenge.
  (IMM) The cook did not have to compete in that round of the competition and was safe from elimination.
  (LOW) The cook was one of the bottom entries in an individual challenge or Pressure Test, and advanced.
  (LOW) The cook was one of the bottom entries in a Team Challenge, and they advanced.
  (ELIM) The cook was eliminated.

Episodes

References 

Television productions postponed due to the COVID-19 pandemic
2022 American television seasons
Season 8